cis-Butene-1,4-diol is a chemical compound used in the production of endosulfan. It reacts with hexachlorocyclopentadiene to form endosulfan diol. Endosulfan diol then reacts with thionyl chloride to form endosulfan.

References

Alkene derivatives
Diols